The International French School of Turin is a French international school in Turin, Italy. It serves all classes from preschool through upper secondary school to year 13.

History

Year 6 classes began in 1974.

Campus

The current campus has hosted the school since 2009. In 2017 the Ministry of Europe and Foreign Affairs bought the campus for the school at an estimated price of 2.5 million euros. The school is on a hillside and has two thousand square meters of interior space and five thousand square meters of exterior space. The institutes large hillside domain is considered to be one of the school's major assets.

See also

 The Lycée Stendhal de Milan - The French school in Milan

References

External links
 International French School of Turin
  International French School of Turin
  International French School of Turin

French international schools in Italy
Schools in Turin
1971 establishments in Italy
Educational institutions established in 1971
Secondary schools in Italy